Where I Wanna Be is the second studio album by American R&B singer Donell Jones. It was released by LaFace Records on October 12, 1999 in the United States. The follow-up to his debut album My Heart (1996), it became his most successful album to date, having gone platinum, and produced three singles, including the worldwide hit "U Know What's Up", Donell's biggest hit single to date, peaking inside the top 10 in the Billboard Hot 100 and at number two on the UK Singles Chart. The album also includes the UK hit "Shorty (Got Her Eyes on Me)", the minor R&B/Hip Hop hit "This Luv" and the US smash hit, soulful ballad and title track, "Where I Wanna Be".

Critical reception

AllMusic editor Stephen Thomas Erlewine rated the album four out of five stars. He found that "on the surface of things, Jones may sound similar to a lot of his peers, but there's a greater sense of musical sophistication in his music. There are light touches of jazz, suave electric pianos, and an easy seductiveness to the entire production [...] For much of the album, Jones hits the right tone – balancing mood, song, and performance quite alluringly. It gets him and the listener where they wanna be."

Chart performance
Where I Wanna Be debuted and peaked at number 35 on the US Billboard 200, with first week sales of 39,000 units. It also marked Jones' first top ten album on the US Top R&B/Hip-Hop Albums. The album was certified Gold by the Recording Industry Association of America (RIAA) on February 8, 2000 and Platinum on May 24, 2000. By June 2002, Where I Wanna Be had sold 1.2 million copies in the US.

Track listing

Charts

Weekly charts

Year-end charts

Certifications

References

External links
[ Where I Wanna Be] at Allmusic

1999 albums
Donell Jones albums
Albums produced by Eddie F